Pennsylvania Session Laws is an 18 volume collection of laws Province and Commonwealth of Pennsylvania from 1682 to 1809. The first volume was published electronically in 2001; volumes 2 to 18 printed in the years spanning 1896 to 1915.
Volume I
Volume II (1700-1712)
Volume III (1712-1724)
Volume IV (1724-1744)
Volume V (1744-1759)
Volume VI (1759-1765)
Volume VII (1765-1770)
Volume VIII (1770-1776)
Volume IX (1776-1779)
Volume X (1779-1781)
Volume XI (1782)
Volume XII (1785-1787)
Volume XIII (1787-1790)
Volume XIV (1791-1793)
Volume XV (1794-1797)
Volume XVI (1798-1801)
Volume XVII (1802-1805)
Volume XVIII (1806-1809)

See also
 Pennsylvania Consolidated Statutes
 Purdon's Pennsylvania Statutes
 Law of Pennsylvania

References

Government of Pennsylvania
Pennsylvania law